Lishan may refer to:

Lishán Didán, modern Jewish Aramaic language

People's Republic of China
Lishan District (立山区), Anshan, Liaoning
Mount Li (骊山), near Xi'an
Lishan, Sui County, town in Sui County, Suizhou, Hubei
Lishan, Hunan (栗山镇), town in Xiangxiang
Lishan, Shanxi (历山镇), town in Yuanqu County
Lishan, Zhejiang (里山镇), town in Fuyang, Zhejiang
Lishan, Meichuan, Wuxue, Huanggang, Hubei

Iran
Lishan, Iran, village in Mazandaran Province

Taiwan
Lishan (梨山), a village in Heping District, Taichung, included in the Tri-Mountain National Scenic Area.